The Dutch International is an open international badminton tournament held in the Netherlands. The tournament annually held in Wateringen and organized by the VELO badminto since 2000. The Dutch International is a part of the European Badminton Circuit and graded as BWF International Series level. This tournament is the second largest badminton event in the Netherlands with a total price money of $10.000.

Previous winners 
The table below gives an overview of the winners at the Dutch International since 2000.

Performances by nation

Erik Meijs Award 
In memory of Erik Meijs the organization has created an Erik Meijs Award to the Most Sportsman Player of the Tournament. Erik Meijs was the 2016 Dutch National Champion who died after being involved in a tragic traffic accident in Germany in November 2017.

See also 
 Dutch Open

References

External links 
 Official Website
 Results from 2000-2012

Badminton tournaments in the Netherlands
Recurring sporting events established in 2000
2000 establishments in the Netherlands
Sports competitions in South Holland
Sport in Westland (municipality), Netherlands